The Trinity Universe (also called the Æon Continuum or the Æonverse) is the shared science fiction setting created by White Wolf Publishing. Its component game lines include:

 Adventure!, a pulp-action game set in 1924.
 Aberrant, a superpowers game set in the near-future (from 2008 to 2015).
 Trinity, a science fiction game where players take on the role of psions in the far future (from 2120 to 2122).

History
ÆON, later known as Trinity was a science-fiction game intended to create a whole new series of games, a trilogy. Rob Hatch's near-future, superheroic Aberrant (1999) had already been in development and was remolded to fit into the "Trinity Universe" setting. By the time the third "Trinity" book was published, it was obvious that the line suffered from insufficient sales, and thus Adventure! (2001), the pulp component of the RPG trilogy, was released as a standalone book. White Wolf's ArtHaus imprint was eventually also in charge of the "Trinity" line, so they produced d20 Trinity books to test the waters for White Wolf's other universes; however, Aberrant d20 (2004), Adventure d20 (2004) and Trinity d20 (2004) came and went in a time when the d20 market was already weakened.

References

Campaign settings